Luiz "Luisinho" Alberto Silva Lemos, also known as Luisinho Tombo (October 3, 1951 – June 2, 2019) was a Brazilian footballer and coach, who started his professional career at América.

While at América, Luizinho was a key player during the most glorious period of the team's history. His 311 goals make him the club's top scorer ever. He was the top goalscorer for the Rio State Championship in 1974 and 1983, playing at América. He also played for Flamengo, Internacional, Botafogo, UD Las Palmas, and Palmeiras.

He scored 434 goals in his career. He finished his career in América in 1987 after having disagreements with América's manager Vanderlei Luxemburgo. He then finished the rest of his playing career in Qatar.

Honours

Player
Taça Guanabara: 1974
Tournament of the Champions 1982
Taça Rio 1982

Manager
 Campeonato Carioca Série B1: 2018

Achievements
Rio State Championship's top scorer: 1974 and 1983

References

External links
 Bio at América

1951 births
2019 deaths
Brazilian footballers
Brazilian football managers
Afro-Brazilian sportspeople
Campeonato Brasileiro Série A players
Expatriate football managers in Qatar
Expatriate football managers in the United Arab Emirates
America Football Club (RJ) players
CR Flamengo managers
Sport Club Internacional players
Botafogo de Futebol e Regatas players
UD Las Palmas players
Sociedade Esportiva Palmeiras players
Al-Wakrah SC players
Al Sadd SC players
Americano Futebol Clube players
Qatar SC players
Qatar Stars League players
America Football Club (RJ) managers
Clube do Remo managers
Madureira Esporte Clube managers
Bonsucesso Futebol Clube managers
Rio Branco Atlético Clube managers
Brasiliense Futebol Clube players
Al-Shamal SC managers
Al Kharaitiyat SC managers
Hatta Club managers
Association football forwards
Sportspeople from Niterói